Blowoff or Blow(ing) off may refer to:
 Blowoff valve
 Blow-off panel, areas with intentionally weakened structure, are used in enclosures, buildings or vehicles where a sudden overpressure may occur
 Blowoff, a dance event created by musicians Richard Morel and Bob Mould
 A type of extra sideshow act 
 A type of clown act
 Hydrodynamic escape
 Blowing off, slang for fellatio
 Blow off, in glossary of professional wrestling terms, the final match in a wrestling feud

See also
 Blow (disambiguation)
 Blowout (disambiguation)